Hakeem Belo-Osagie is a Nigerian businessman. He is chair of Metis Capital Partners an organisation focused on brokering and delivering attractive, large-ticket transactions in Africa to select blue chip international investment partners. He was listed by Forbes Magazine as the forty-first richest man in Africa in 2014.

Belo-Osagie is the son of Professor Tiamiyu Belo-Osagie, a renowned gynecologist who catered to the medical needs of the family of former Nigerian military president Ibrahim Babangida. Through that connection, Hakeem secured a job as Special Assistant to the Presidential Adviser on Petroleum and Energy and later as Special Assistant to the Minister of Petroleum and Energy, late Alhaji Rilwan Lukmon. The appointments, he admits put him in the position to close in on a few oil deals from which he made his first fortune.

Belo-Osagie started his career as a petroleum economist and lawyer, following his graduation from Harvard Business School. For more than three decades, he has been a key player in the Nigerian economy through his participation in several private sector businesses; particularly in the fields of energy, finance and telecommunications. Up Until 2017, Belo-Osagie was the chairman of Etisalat's Nigerian arm, in which he controlled a significant stake. He also has a range of other business interests in Nigeria.

Belo-Osagie and his wife, Dr Myma Belo-Osagie (a founding partner of Udo Udoma & Belo-Osagie), are noted philanthropists who believe strongly in the power of education. They are among the largest donors to the African Leadership Academy in Johannesburg, and have endowed a fund for the promotion of Africa at Yale University. The couple are also supporters of Harvard University's Center for African Studies, and Belo-Osagie has established a scholarship to support African students studying at Balliol College, Oxford.

Belo-Osagie and his wife are both members of Harvard University's Global Advisory Council. Belo-Osagie also serves on the Yale University President's Council on International Activities and the New York University President's Global Council. In addition, Belo-Osagie sits on the International Advisory Council of the Brookings Institution and the Global Board of Advisors of the Council on Foreign Relations.

Belo-Osagie and his wife are among the largest donors to the African Leadership Academy (the "ALA"), a residential secondary school in Johannesburg that works to educate Africa's brightest students. Founded in 2008, the highly selective ALA immerses promising young people in a rigorous two-year curriculum of leadership, service and African studies. The ALA network of alumni includes almost four hundred young leaders drawn from forty three countries across the continent. In 2012, the academy unveiled the "Hakeem and Myma Belo-Osagie Wing", named in recognition of the couple's support of the ALA and their advocacy on its behalf.

Belo-Osagie is also the founder and Chairman of the board of FSDH holding company, which includes among its holdings FSDH merchant Bank, FSDH Asset management, PAL pensions and FSDH securities trading company

Personal life and education 
Belo-Osagie was born in Lagos, Nigeria in 1955. His father was a professional gynaecologist and his mother was a nurse. He is the father of Yasmin Belo-Osagie. He attended King's College in Lagos and completed his secondary education at the United World College of the Atlantic in Wales.

Belo-Osagie holds a law degree from the University of Cambridge, a MA in Politics, Philosophy and Economics from the University of Oxford and an MBA from the Harvard Business School. He is a member of the Nigerian Bar Association.

He currently lives in Nigeria with his wife Dr.Myma Belo-Osagie and their four children

Career

Oil industry

Belo-Osagie returned to Nigeria shortly after graduating from Harvard in 1980. He began his career in the service of the Federal Government of Nigeria working in various capacities in the energy sector ranging from Special Assistant to the Presidential Adviser on petroleum and energy, to Secretary of the Oil Policy Review and LNG Committees. He subsequently worked in the Petrochemicals Division of the Nigerian National Petroleum Corporation. He resigned his appointment in 1986 to set up CTIC, which became a leading energy consulting firm. He also chairs the board of Vitol Nigeria, which is a subsidiary of the Swiss-based Vitol Group, a multinational energy and commodity trading firm.

Finance

In 1998 Belo-Osagie became the chairman of the board of directors of The United Bank for Africa Plc (the "UBA"), one of the largest commercial banks in Nigeria. He resigned from this post in March 2004, in the wake of unsubstantiated allegations made by The Central Bank of Nigeria (the "CBN") that the UBA had been involved in unlicensed foreign exchange trading. As a result of these allegations, Belo-Osagie was immediately blacklisted by the CBN. In 2005, local reports suggested that the Nigerian Economic and Financial Crimes Commission had launched an investigation into Belo-Osagie's chairmanship of the UBA. No criminal charges were ever filed against him. On 24 May 2010 the CBN acknowledged its actions to have been unduly punitive, and removed Belo-Osagie from its blacklist with immediate effect.

Belo-Osagie is also the founder and Chairman of the board of FSDH holding company, which includes among its holdings FSDH merchant Bank, FSDH Asset management, PAL pensions and FSDH securities trading company

Telecommunications and other recent ventures

Belo-Osagie until recently, was the chairman of the board of directors of Emerging Markets Telecommunications Services Ltd, a mobile telephone operator which operates in Nigeria under the Etisalat brand. He is the ultimate beneficial owner of a significant stake in the company, which is operated as a joint venture with Mubadala Development Company and the Etisalat group.

Belo-Osagie is the chairman of and main shareholder in Duval Properties Limited, a real estate company currently engaged in developing a major new residential and commercial district at Jabi Lake in Abuja. He also chairs the board of Vitol Nigeria, which is a subsidiary of the Swiss-based Vitol Group, a multinational energy and commodity trading firm.

Belo-Osagie has also recently invested in Andela, which is developing a network of high quality computer science education programmes across the African continent. Andela operates a self-financing model of education: it funds the training of promising young 
programmers, and generates revenue by supplying its graduates' services to a range of global clients. Belo-Osagie also sits on Andela's board.

Non-executive and honorary positions

Belo-Osagie sits on the Global Board of Advisers of the Council on Foreign Relations, a leading non-partisan US think-tank.  In 2015, Belo-Osagie was appointed to the International Advisory Board of the Brookings Institution in Washington DC, which has been described as the most influential think-tank in the world.

Belo-Osagie and his wife both serve as members of Harvard University's Global Advisory Council. Belo-Osagie is also a member of the Yale University President's Council on International Activities and the New York University President's Global Council.

Belo-Osagie was appointed by the Nigerian Minister of the Federal Capital Territory to act as a non-executive chairman of the Abuja Investment Corporation from 2007 to 2011. He did not receive a salary for this role. Belo-Osagie also currently chairs Chocolate City Music Group, a leading Nigerian entertainment company.

Philanthropy 
Belo-Osagie and his wife are among the largest donors to the African Leadership Academy (the "ALA"), a residential secondary school in Johannesburg that works to educate Africa's brightest students. Founded in 2008, the highly selective ALA immerses promising young people in a rigorous two-year curriculum of leadership, service and African studies. The ALA network of alumni includes almost four hundred young leaders drawn from forty three countries across the continent. In 2012, the academy unveiled the "Hakeem and Myma Belo-Osagie Wing", named in recognition of the couple's support of the ALA and their advocacy on its behalf.

The couple have recently established the "Hakeem and Myma Belo-Osagie Fund for the Promotion of Africa" at Yale University, and are supporters of Harvard University's Center for African Studies. Belo-Osagie has also endowed a fund to provide scholarships for African students studying at Balliol College, Oxford.

Belo-Osagie serves on the board of Alfanar, a charity which applies the principles of private sector investment to charitable giving to help build sustainable social enterprises throughout the Arab world. He also chairs the Nigerian National Committee for the United World Colleges, which assists the organisation's member colleges in identifying suitable candidates for their two-year International Baccalaureate scholarship programmes. Mr Belo-Osagie has also funded several scholarships to the United World Colleges.

References 

Living people
Harvard Business School alumni
King's College, Lagos alumni
20th-century Nigerian businesspeople
21st-century Nigerian businesspeople
Businesspeople from Lagos
Alumni of the University of Cambridge
Alumni of the University of Oxford
Nigerian expatriates in the United States
People educated at Atlantic College
People educated at a United World College
Panama Papers
People from Edo State
Nigerian brokers
Nigerian chairpersons of corporations
1955 births